Brian Lee Hunter (born March 25, 1971) is a former center fielder in Major League Baseball. At 6'4" and around 180 lbs, he was known for stealing over 70 bases in 1997.

Minor league career
Hunter was born on March 25, 1971 in Portland, Oregon. He graduated from Fort Vancouver High School in Vancouver, Washington.

Hunter, who threw and batted right-handed, was drafted by the Houston Astros in the 2nd round (35th Overall) of the 1989 amateur draft. Hunter spent a little over five and a half seasons in the minor leagues. He began his pro career with the Gulf Coast League Astros in 1989. Hunter then went on to spend the next three seasons in class A playing for the Asheville Tourists of the South Atlantic League in 1990 and then the Osceola Astros of the Florida State League for two seasons 1991–1992. After a season in Class AA with the Jackson Generals of the Texas League, Hunter moved up to Class AAA and played part of the season with the Pacific Coast League's Tucson Toros in 1994.

Major league career
Hunter made his major league debut for the Astros on June 27, 1994 against the Cincinnati Reds. In five at bats he contributed with one hit, and stole his first base in this game. He played with Houston through the 1996 season. On December 10 of that year he was traded along with Orlando Miller, Todd Jones and Doug Brocail, as well as cash, to the Detroit Tigers for Daryle Ward, C. J. Nitkowski, Trever Miller, José Lima and Brad Ausmus.

He played for Detroit from 1997–1999. In 1997 he led the Major Leagues with 74 stolen bases, and was caught stealing 18 times; his stolen bases that year for the Tigers have not been surpassed by an American League player since.  He played in all 162 games that year; he also led the league in putouts, and committed only four errors.  As a batter, Hunter set the Tigers all-time record for outs with 525, which still stands today.

On April 28, during the 1999 season, he was traded to the Seattle Mariners for Andy Van Hekken and minor league outfielder Jerry Amador. He again led the AL in stolen bases, this time with 44, in 1999, although his .232 batting average was the worst among qualified batters. On March 27, 2000 he was released by the Mariners, and four days later he signed with the Colorado Rockies, who traded him to the Reds on August 6. On November 27 he was released by the Reds, and on January 10, 2001 Hunter signed with the Philadelphia Phillies who in turn granted him free agency on November 5, which allowed him to play 2002-2003 and finish his career where it began, with the Astros, where he retired.   

Because of his ability to steal bases, ESPN's Chris Berman nicknamed the outfielder, "Deer" Hunter.

Coaching career
Hunter was hired as hitting coach for the Everett AquaSox for the 2015 season. After two years in that role, he was hired as a coach for the Tacoma Rainiers.

See also
 List of Major League Baseball career stolen bases leaders
 List of Major League Baseball annual stolen base leaders

References

External links
, or Retrosheet, or Venezuelan Winter League

1971 births
Living people
African-American baseball players
American League stolen base champions
Asheville Tourists players
Baseball players from Portland, Oregon
Camden Riversharks players
Cincinnati Reds players
Colorado Rockies players
Detroit Tigers players
Gulf Coast Astros players
Houston Astros players
Jackson Generals (Texas League) players
Major League Baseball center fielders
Memphis Redbirds players
Navegantes del Magallanes players
American expatriate baseball players in Venezuela
New Orleans Zephyrs players
Osceola Astros players
Palm Beach Cardinals players
Baseball players from Seattle
Philadelphia Phillies players
Scranton/Wilkes-Barre Red Barons players
Seattle Mariners players
Sportspeople from Vancouver, Washington
Tucson Toros players
21st-century African-American sportspeople
20th-century African-American sportspeople